The Pittsburgh Bureau of Fire (PBF) provides fire suppression and prevention for the City of Pittsburgh, as well as BLS response on medical details. The Bureau was the first fire department in the United States to unionize and thus has the International Association of Fire Fighters (IAFF) local number of 1.

The Fire Bureau provides fire/rescue services to the Borough of Wilkinsburg and Ingram Borough through the use of two engine companies.

History
The Bureau started out as a volunteer fire department and officially transitioned to a fully paid department on May 23, 1870. Over 30 years later in 1903 a group of Pittsburgh firefighters sought to improve working and living conditions of those serving in the department. They formed an association known as the City Fireman's Protective Association. By September 1903, the first International Association of Fire Fighters union was organized, IAFF Local No. 1.

Stations and apparatus

Below is a complete listing of all fire station and apparatus locations in the city of Pittsburgh according to Battalion.

Notes

In pop culture
Sudden Death - A Pittsburgh firefighter is portrayed by Jean-Claude Van Damme.

References 

Fire departments in Pennsylvania
Fire
Fire